Ederney is a village situated primarily in the townlands of Drumkeen and of Ederny in County Fermanagh, Northern Ireland.

At the 2011 Census it had a population of 587. Ederney lies in the Glendarragh River Valley near Lower Lough Erne and Kesh. The village and its hinterland (the Glendarragh Valley area) has a population of several thousand.

Due to Ederney's position adjacent to Lough Erne the village is located on a tourist route.

Public transport
Ulsterbus route 194 serves Ederney with one daily journey in each direction except Sundays, linking it to Irvinestown, Enniskillen and Pettigo. Route 83A provides a link to Omagh on Mondays & Thursdays only.

History
Local historian Leo Mulligan MBE details that at the time of the Plantation there was a settlement of significance at Ederny when the land grant (titled "Edernagh") was given to Captain Thomas Blennerhassett of Norfolk in 1610. He created the Manor of Edernagh on a  demesne and a court baron on the shores of Lough Erne, which he later named Castle Hassett. He established the new village of Ederny (Edernagh).

By 1797, the settlement is recorded in the Topographia Hibernica as Ederny Bridge and "fair days" were held there.

Built heritage

One of the principal buildings in the village is Ederney Town Hall, locally styled as the "Townhall", erected in 1839. It remains in use as a village community centre.

Another local landmark is Drumskinny stone circle. Drumskinny is the site of a stone circle in the nearby townland of Drumskinny. The site consists of 39 stones set in a circle. The arrangement is reportedly related to the seasons, moon and sun, and dates from the Bronze Age.

Sport
The village has a Gaelic football club, Ederney St Joseph's.

Demographics
As of the 2011 census, there were 587 people living in Ederney. Of these:
17.21% were aged under 16 years and 18.91% were aged 65 and over
50.6% of the population were male and 49.4% were female
82.11% were from a Catholic background and 15.5% were from a Protestant background

Notable people
 Michael Barrett, Fenian and last man to be publicly hanged in Britain.
 Martin McGrath, inter county Gaelic footballer for Fermanagh who was one only three Fermanagh players to win a GAA All Star award.

See also
 Market Houses in Northern Ireland

References

External links
 St Joseph's Parish Website
 Fermanagh Gold - A Little History of Ederney

Villages in County Fermanagh
Townlands of County Fermanagh
Civil parish of Magheraculmoney
Fermanagh and Omagh district